Bradford County is a county in the Commonwealth of Pennsylvania. It is part of Northeastern Pennsylvania. As of the 2020 census, its population was 59,967. Its county seat is Towanda.  The county was created on February 21, 1810, from parts of Lycoming and Luzerne Counties.  Originally called Ontario County, it was reorganized and separated from Lycoming County on October 13, 1812, and renamed Bradford County for William Bradford, who had been a chief justice of the Pennsylvania Supreme Court and United States Attorney General.

Bradford County comprises the Sayre, Pennsylvania micropolitan statistical area.

The county is not to be confused with the city of Bradford, which is in McKean County, 141 miles to the west via U.S. Route 6.

History
As noted above, Bradford County was originally named Ontario County. The county was reorganized and renamed in 1812, but a section of north Philadelphia in which major east–west streets are named after Pennsylvania counties retains an Ontario Street, between Westmoreland and Tioga Streets. Two short Bradford Streets are in northeast Philadelphia, about 4 miles from Ontario Street.

Bradford County is the ancestral home of the Tehotitachsae indigenous people of North America. Their principal village, Gohontoto, was on the site of the present Borough of Wyalusing.

Geography
It is the second-largest county in Pennsylvania by land area and third-largest by total area.

Climate

Bradford has a warm-summer humid continental climate (Dfb) and average monthly temperatures in Towanda range from 24.5°F in January to 70.6°F in July.

Adjacent counties
 Tioga County, New York (northeast)
 Chemung  County, New York (northwest)
 Susquehanna County (east)
 Sullivan County (south)
 Lycoming County (southwest)
 Tioga County (west)

Demographics

As of the census of 2000, there were 62,761 people, 24,453 households, and 17,312 families residing in the county.  The population density was 54 people per square mile (21/km2).  There were 28,664 housing units at an average density of 25 per square mile (10/km2). The racial makeup of the county was 97.94% White, 0.40% Black or African American, 0.31% Native American, 0.45% Asian, 0.01% Pacific Islander, 0.19% from other races, and 0.69% from two or more races. 0.63% of the population were Hispanic or Latino of any race. 32.4% were of English, 19% German, 12.6% Irish and 6.4% Italian ancestry.

There were 24,453 households, out of which 31.80% had children under the age of 18 living with them, 57.40% were married couples living together, 8.90% had a female householder with no husband present, and 29.20% were non-families. 24.70% of all households were made up of individuals, and 11.50% had someone living alone who was 65 years of age or older.  The average household size was 2.52 and the average family size was 2.99.

In the county, the population was spread out, with 25.50% under the age of 18, 6.80% from 18 to 24, 27.20% from 25 to 44, 24.70% from 45 to 64, and 15.70% who were 65 years of age or older.  The median age was 39 years. For every 100 females there were 95.10 males.  For every 100 females age 18 and over, there were 92.10 males.

2020 Census

Micropolitan Statistical Area

The United States Office of Management and Budget has designated Bradford County as the Sayre, PA Micropolitan Statistical Area (µSA).  As of the 2010 U.S. Census the micropolitan area ranked 8th most populous in the State of Pennsylvania and the 131st most populous in the United States with a population of 62,622.

Law and government
Bradford County is a Republican Party stronghold in presidential elections. The only two instances Republican presidential candidates have failed to win the county from 1880 to the present were when Theodore Roosevelt won it in 1912 by splitting the Republican vote & in 1964 when Lyndon B. Johnson won statewide & nationally in a landslide. Johnson is also the only Democrat to ever manage over forty percent of the county's vote. Even so, he won Bradford County only narrowly, by just over one percent.

County commissioners
 Daryl Miller, Chairman, Republican
 Doug McLinko, Vice-Chairman, Republican
 John Sullivan, Democrat

Other county officials
 Auditors, Jeff Warner, Eric Matthews, Sebrina Shanks
 Clerk of Courts and Prothonotary, Dawn Close, Republican
 Coroner, James Bowen
 District Attorney, N.A.
 Register of Wills and Recorder of Deeds, Sheila Johnson, Republican
 Sheriff, Clinton J. Walters, Republican
 Treasurer, Matthew Allen, Republican

State Senate
 Gene Yaw, Republican, Pennsylvania's 23rd Senatorial District

State House of Representatives
 Clint Owlett, Republican, Pennsylvania's 68th Representative District
 Tina Pickett, Republican, Pennsylvania's 110th Representative District

United States House of Representatives
 Dan Meuser, Republican, Pennsylvania's 9th congressional district

United States Senate
 John Fetterman, Democrat
 Bob Casey, Democrat

Economy
Major employers are the natural gas industry, farming, logging, DuPont, Global-Tungsten and Powders (formerly Sylvania), Jeld-Wen, and Cargill Regional Beef, Wyalusing.

Education

Public school districts
 Athens Area School District
 Canton Area School District (also in Lycoming and Tioga Counties)
 Northeast Bradford School District
 Sayre Area School District
 Towanda Area School District
 Troy Area School District
 Wyalusing Area School District (also in Wyoming County)

Other public school entities
 BLAST Intermediate Unit 17
 Northern Tier Career Center Towanda
 Adult Ed Linkage Services – Troy
 Lackawanna College Towanda Center

Private schools
 Canton Country School – Canton
 Children's Place – Sayre
 Epiphany School (Catholic) Pre-K–6 – Sayre accepting OSTCP students
 Freedom Lane Academy – Milan
 G&G Learning Center – Rome
 Maranatha Mission Learning Community Branch 19 – Canton
 North Rome Christian School
 South Hill Amish School – Wyalusing
 St. Agnes Elementary School – Towanda accepting OSTCP students
 Union Valley Christian School – Ulster
 Valley View Amish School – Pike Township
 Wyalusing Valley Children's Center INC – Wyalusing

Data from EdNA database maintained by Pennsylvania Department of Education 2012

Libraries
 Allen F. Pierce Free Library – Troy
 Bradford County Library – Troy
 Bradford County Library System – Troy
 Green Free Library – Canton
 Mather Memorial Library – Ulster
 Monroeton Public Library – Monroeton
 New Albany Community Library Inc.
 Sayre Public Library
 Spalding Memorial Library – Athens
 Towanda Public Library
 Wyalusing Public Library

Transportation
Public transportation is provided by BeST Transit.

Major Highways
  (briefly crosses the NY-PA state border, but is maintained by NYSDOT)

Recreation
There is one Pennsylvania state park in Bradford County.
 Mt. Pisgah State Park

Communities

Under Pennsylvania law, there are four types of incorporated municipalities: cities, boroughs, townships, and, in only one case (Bloomsburg, Columbia County), towns. The following boroughs and townships are located in Bradford County:

Boroughs

 Alba
 Athens
 Burlington
 Canton
 Le Raysville
 Monroe
 New Albany
 Rome
 Sayre
 South Waverly
 Sylvania
 Towanda (county seat)
 Troy
 Wyalusing

Townships

 Albany
 Armenia
 Asylum
 Athens
 Burlington
 Canton
 Columbia
 Franklin
 Granville
 Herrick
 Leroy
 Litchfield
 Monroe
 North Towanda
 Orwell
 Overton
 Pike
 Ridgebury
 Rome
 Sheshequin
 Smithfield
 South Creek
 Springfield
 Standing Stone
 Stevens
 Terry
 Towanda
 Troy
 Tuscarora
 Ulster
 Warren
 Wells
 West Burlington
 Wilmot
 Windham
 Wyalusing
 Wysox

Census-designated place
 Greens Landing

Unincorporated communities
 Berrytown
 Browntown

Population ranking
The population ranking of the following table is based on the 2010 census of Bradford County.

† county seat

See also
 National Register of Historic Places listings in Bradford County, Pennsylvania

References

External links
 Bradford County official website
 Bradford County Historical Society
 Bradford County Tourism Promotion Agency
 Pennsylvania Department of Transportation, Bureau of Planning and Research, Geographic Information Division, "2022 General Highway Map of Bradford County". Note: shows boroughs, townships, roads, villages, some streams. URL accessed on January 10, 2023.

 
1810 establishments in Pennsylvania
Counties of Appalachia
Populated places established in 1810